Elaine H. Beech (born March 16, 1960) is an American politician. She was a member of the Alabama House of Representatives from the 65th District and served from 2009 until her defeat in 2019. 
She was elected and served as a member of the Democratic party, though joined the Republican Party in 2022.

References

1960 births
21st-century American politicians
Democratic Party members of the Alabama House of Representatives
Living people
People from Washington County, Alabama